Daddy Cool may refer to:

 "Daddy Cool" (The Rays song), a 1957 song by US doo-wop group The Rays, also covered by Drummond and Darts
 "Daddy Cool" (Boney M. song), a 1976 hit single by Boney M.
 Daddy Cool (band), a 1970s Australian rock band, reformed since 2005
 Daddy Cool (2009 Malayalam film), a 2009 Malayalam film
 Daddy Cool (2009 Hindi film), a 2009 Hindi film
 Daddy Cool (novel), a 1974 book by Donald Goines
 Daddy Cool (musical), a 2006 musical featuring the music of Boney M and other Frank Farian productions